Senator Keller may refer:

James Keller (Minnesota politician) (1907–1972), Minnesota State Senate
Kent E. Keller (1867–1954), Illinois State Senate
Kevin Keller (comics), fictional U.S. Senator from an unspecified state in the Archie Comics universe
Marvin Keller (1906–1976), Pennsylvania State Senate
Maryanne Keller (born 1949), Colorado State Senate
Tim Keller (politician) (born 1977), New Mexico State Senate